Soheila Esfahani is an Iranian artist and educator currently working in Canada. She received her Master of Fine Arts degree from the University of Western Ontario and her BA in Fine Arts from the University of Waterloo. She is an Assistant Professor at Western University.  She was the receipt of the Ontario Arts Council Project Grant: Mid career artist Esfahani has also received awards from Canada Council for the Arts, the Social Sciences & Humanities Research Council of Canada, the Ontario Arts Council, and the Region of Waterloo Arts Fund. Notably, she was nominated for the Jameel Prize at the Victoria & Albert Museum in London, UK in 2015.

Artistic career 
Esfahani has exhibited numerous shows in Canada and internationally, including:

 Been T(here) at Red Head Gallery in Toronto, in 2022, Pattern (dis)Placement,
 Redeemer University College Gallery, 2019 in Ancaster, ON, 
 Interstice, Republic Gallery, Vancouver, BC, 2019
 In-Between, Durham Art Gallery, Durham, ON. 2016
 Trans-(across, over, beyond), MFA Thesis Exhibition, Art Lab, University of Western Ontario, London, ON.

Publications 
 Pasiechnik, Jenelle M. Embodied Engagements: The Artwork of Jamelie Hassan & Soheila Esfahani in Translations, Exhibition catalogue, Campbell River Art Gallery, Campbell River, BC. 2020
 The Living River Project: Art, water and Possible Worlds exhibition catalogue, Art Gallery of Windsor, Windsor, ON. 2019
 The Source: Rethinking Water Through Contemporary Art exhibition catalogue, Rodman Hall Art Centre, Brock University, St. Catharines, ON. 2017
 Embracing Place exhibition catalogue, Homer Watson House & Gallery, Kitchener, ON. 2017
 The Red Head Gallery at 25 exhibition catalogue, The Red Head Gallery, Toronto, ON. 2017
 Matotek, Jennifer ed. Material Girls. London, UK: Black Dog Publishing Ltd, 2015.

Footnotes

Living people
Year of birth missing (living people)
21st-century Canadian women artists
Canadian people of Iranian descent
University of Western Ontario alumni
University of Waterloo alumni
21st-century women educators